Hellas ohne Götter is an East German film directed by Karl Gass. It was released in 1957.

External links

References

1957 films
East German films
1950s German-language films
1950s short documentary films
German short documentary films
1950s German films